Nalla Thangal is a 1955 Indian Tamil-language film directed by P. V. Krishna Iyer. The film stars R. S. Manohar and G. Varalakshmi. The movie is a remake of director's own Malayalam movie Nalla Thanka. (1950).

Cast & Crew
The lists are adapted from the database of Film News Anandan.

Cast

R. S. Manohar
G. Varalakshmi
A. P. Nagarajan
Madhuri Devi
J. P. Chandrababu
V. M. Ezhumalai
E. V. Saroja
Mohana

Crew

Producer:
Director: P. V. Krishna Iyer
Screenplay and Dialogues: A. K. Velan
Cinematography: Vasudeva Rao, Karnataki
Editing: Paul G. Yadav
Art: Jayavanth S. K.
Choreography: Kumari Bharathi, Madhavan, Balaraman
Studio: Film Centre

Production
A film with this title was first released in 1935. Another film with a similar title: Nalla Thangai, was released earlier in 1955 with a different cast and crew. Though the last letter differs in both the titles, in Tamil, means the same - Good Younger Sister.

Soundtrack
Music was composed by G. Ramanathan, while the lyrics were penned by Vedanayagam Pillai and A. Maruthakasi. Singer is J. P. Chandrababu. Playback singers are P. Leela, N. L. Ganasaraswathi, A. P. Komala, A. G. Rathnamala, K. Jamuna Rani, G. Ramanathan, T. M. Soundararajan, Sirkazhi Govindarajan, V. T. Rajagopalan, D. B. Ramachandra,  Udutha Sarojini and Nirmala.

References

1950s Tamil-language films
Films scored by G. Ramanathan